T'uru Qurin (Quechua t'uru mud, quri gold,  "mud gold", -n a suffix, also spelled Turojurin) is a mountain in the Andes of Peru which reaches a height of approximately . It is located in the Junín Region, Jauja Province, Pomacancha District.

References 

Mountains of Peru
Mountains of Junín Region